Infinity Pool may refer to:
Infinity Pool (film), a 2023 sci-fi horror film by Brandon Cronenberg
Infinity pool, a reflecting pool or swimming pool without visible boundaries

See also 
 Limiters of the Infinity Pool, a 2011 music album